Till Next Time – The Best of TNT is a compilation album by the Norwegian hard rock band TNT.

Personnel

Band 
Tony Harnell – vocals
Ronni Le Tekrø – guitars, guitar synthesizer, 1/4 stepper guitar
Morty Black – bass guitar, pedal synthesizer, fretless bass with reverb and chorus effect on "Forever Shine On"
Diesel Dahl – drums, percussion
Kenneth Odiin – drums, percussion

Additional personnel
Baard Svensen – keyboards, programming and background vocals
Håkon Iversen – background vocals
Bjørn Nessjø – keyboards and programming
Carlos Waadeland – keyboards and programming
Kjetil Bjerkestrand – keyboards
Joe Lynn Turner – background vocals

Track listing

Album credits 
Bjørn Nessjø – producer
Rune Nordahl – engineer

References

External links
http://www.ronniletekro.com/discography-album-13.html

1996 greatest hits albums
TNT (Norwegian band) albums